Donald B. Darling is a Canadian politician, who served as the mayor of Saint John, New Brunswick for one term, 2016 to 2021. He was elected on May 9, 2016 in the 2016 New Brunswick municipal elections, and was sworn in as mayor on May 25.  He did not run for re-election in 2021.

He donated to the Conservative Party of Canada in 2015.

Darling is known to have an interest in colourful, flamboyant socks. He is known to have engaged citizens in person, at local coffee shops, his mayoral office, and online through social media channels.  Darling was a professional bowler prior to taking office and won many championships in the 1990s; including the Fairview Lanes Centennial Closer Tournament.

Electoral record

References

Mayors of Saint John, New Brunswick
Living people
Politicians from Fredericton
Year of birth missing (living people)